This page provides supplementary chemical data on methanol.

Safety Data Sheet  

The handling of this chemical may incur notable safety precautions. It is highly recommended that you seek the Safety Datasheet (SDS) for this chemical from a reliable source such as SIRI, and follow its directions. SDS is available at MSDS, J.T. Baker and Loba Chemie

Structure and properties

Thermodynamic properties

Spectral data

Vapor pressure of liquid
 
Here is a similar formula from the 67th edition of the CRC handbook. Note that the form of this formula as given is a fit to the Clausius–Clapeyron equation, which is a good theoretical starting point for calculating saturation vapor pressures:
log10(P) = −(0.05223)a/T + b, where P is in mmHg, T is in kelvins, a = 38324, and b = 8.8017.

Properties of aqueous methanol solutions
Data obtained from Lange's Handbook of Chemistry, 10th ed. and CRC Handbook of Chemistry and Physics 44th ed. The annotation, d a°C/b°C, indicates density of solution at temperature a divided by density of pure water at temperature b known as specific gravity. When temperature b is 4 °C, density of water is 0.999972 g/mL.

Distillation data

References

  (sample table of physical properties)

External links

Chemical data pages
Methanol
Chemical data pages cleanup